Navarretia intertexta is a species of flowering plant in the family phlox, known by the common name needleleaf pincushionplant.

It is native to western North America, including most of the western United States and extending into the Midwest. It grows in a variety of habitat types, including moist meadows and vernal pools.

It is a hairy annual herb growing up to about 28 centimeters long, growing erect or spreading wider than tall. The leaves are divided into many needlelike lobes. The inflorescence is a head of flowers lined with leaflike bracts with needle-shaped lobes, and often with a coat of dense hairs. The flowers are white to blue and tubular in shape.

External links
Jepson Manual Treatment
Photo gallery

intertexta
Flora of the Western United States
Flora of the Sierra Nevada (United States)
Flora of California
Natural history of the California chaparral and woodlands
Flora without expected TNC conservation status